The American Academy of Religion (AAR) is the world's largest association of scholars in the field of religious studies and related topics.  It is a nonprofit member association, 
serving as a professional and learned society for scholars involved in the academic study of religion. It has some 10,000 members worldwide, with the largest concentration being in the United States and Canada. AAR members are university and college professors, independent scholars, secondary teachers, clergy, seminarians, students, and interested lay-people.

History 

AAR was founded in 1909 as the Association of Biblical Instructors in American Colleges and Secondary Schools. The name was changed to National Association of Biblical Instructors (NABI) in 1933. The American Academy of Religion was adopted as the organization name in 1963 to reflect its broader, inclusive mission to foster the academic study of all religions. Over its long history, AAR has broadened its scope to reflect contemporary values of its membership, such as responding to feminist scholarship and women in religion, increased attention to religions beyond Christianity, differentiation between theology and/or religious reflection within the academic study of religion as a cultural/historical/political phenomenon, and engagement with the public understanding of religion. Stausberg suggested that "Probably because of its more encompassing and open policy and its strategy to position itself as the default home for Religious Studies in the United States, the AAR has been a success story." 
Presidents of the AAR have included well-known scholars such as Judith Plaskow, Mark Juergensmeyer, Wendy Doniger, Emilie Townes, Peter J. Paris, Rebecca Chopp, Elizabeth A. Clark and Ann Taves.

Publications 

Oxford University Press publishes Journal of the American Academy of Religion on behalf of the AAR. Religious Studies News is the quarterly newspaper of record for the organization; it transitioned from a print to online-only publication in 2010. AAR published the online book review Reading Religion. AAR publishes five book series through Oxford University Press: Academy; Reflection and Theory in the Study of Religion; Religion, Culture, and Theory; Religion in Translation; and Teaching Religious Studies. AAR presents awards each year to notable books in the study of religion. It offers three categories of Awards for Excellence: Analytical-Descriptive Studies, Historical Studies, and Constructive-Reflective Studies.

Annual meeting 

AAR hosts an Annual Meeting each year in November. The AAR Annual Meeting is the world's largest meeting for religious studies scholars. Over 400 events, including meetings, receptions, and academic sessions, occur on the AAR program alone; hundreds more, hosted by affiliated societies and institutions, occur over the course of the meeting. The location of the meeting changes each year. The annual meetings of the AAR are attended by about half their membership "(some 4,500 in 2014), which make these meetings by far the most important social arena for academic interaction" in comparison with meetings of other North American academic societies for the study of religion.The AAR Annual Meeting program is developed entirely by volunteers involved in program units representing disciplines and sub-disciplines within the field.

Other activities 

AAR offers activities on a regional level for its members. Professional development resources such as research grants, career services, and scholarships are some of the member benefits. AAR also advocates the importance of the critical study of religion on institutional and national levels.

Presidents 
The President is part of the Board of Directors, which is elected by AAR members each September and takes up their post at the close of each annual meeting.

 1910–1925: Charles Foster Kent
 1926: Irving Francis Wood
 1927: Eliza H. Kendrick
 1928: Walter W. Haviland
 1929: Ralph K. Hickok
 1930: Irwin R. Beiler
 1931: Laura H. Wild
 1932: Chester Warren Quimby
 1933: James Muilenburg
 1934: Elmer W. K. Mould
 1935: Florence M. Fitch
 1936: S. Ralph Harlow
 1937: Frank G. Lankard
 1938: Mary E. Andrews
 1939: William Scott
 1940: Harvie Branscomb
 1941: Katherine H. Paton
 1942–1943: Edgar S. Brightman
 1944: Floyd V. Filson
 1945: Mary Ely Lyman
 1946: J. Paul Williams
 1947: Rolland E. Wolfe
 1948: 
 1949: Vernon McCasland
 1950: Virginia Corwin
 1951: Mary Francis Thelen
 1952: Charles S. Braden
 1953: Carl E. Purinton
 1954: W. Gordon Ross
 1955: Arthur C. Wickenden
 1956: A. Roy Eckardt
 1957: Robert M. Montgomery
 1958: H. Neil Richardson
 1959: Lauren Brubaker Jr.
 1960: Lionel Whiston Jr.
 1961: Robert V. Smith
 1962: Fred D. Geally
 1963: Clyde A. Holbrook
 1964: Ira Martin
 1965: James Price
 1966: William Hordern
 1967: John Priest
 1968: J. Wesley Robb
 1969: Jacob Neusner
 1970: Claude Welch
 1971: James Burtchaell
 1972: Robert Michaelson
 1973: Charles Long
 1974: Christine Downing
 1975: William E. May
 1976: Preston Williams
 1977: Schubert M. Ogden
 1978: John Meagher
 1979: Langdon Gilkey
 1980: William Clebsch
 1981: Jill Raitt
 1982: Gordon D. Kaufman
 1983: Wilfred Cantwell Smith
 1984: Ray Hart
 1985: Wendy Doniger
 1986: Nathan A. Scott Jr.
 1987: John Dillenberger
 1988: Martin E. Marty
 1989: Robert Wilken
 1990: Elizabeth A. Clark
 1991: Judith Berling
 1992: Robert Cummings Neville
 1993: Edith Wyschogrod
 1994: Catherine Albanese
 1995: Peter Paris
 1996: Lawrence Sullivan
 1997: Robert Detweiler
 1998: Judith Plaskow
 1999: Margaret R. Miles
 2000: Ninian Smart
 2001: Rebecca Chopp
 2002: Vasudha Narayanan
 2003: Robert Orsi
 2004: Jane Dammen McAuliffe
 2005: Hans J. Hillerbrand
 2006: Diana L. Eck
 2007: Jeffrey Stout
 2008: Emilie Townes
 2009: Mark Juergensmeyer
 2010: Ann Taves
 2011: Kwok Pui-lan
 2012: Otto Maduro
 2013: John Esposito
 2014: Laurie Zoloth
 2015: Thomas Tweed
 2016: Serene Jones
 2017: Eddie Glaude
 2018: David P. Gushee
 2019: Laurie L. Patton
 2020: José I. Cabezón
 2021: Marla F. Frederick
 2022: Mayra Rivera

References

External links 
 

1909 establishments in the United States
Learned societies of the United States
Professional associations based in the United States
Religious studies conferences
Theological societies